Liga Deportiva Universitaria de Quito's 1986 season was the club's 56th year of existence, the 33rd year in professional football and the 26th in the top level of professional football in Ecuador.

Kits
Sponsor(s): Mutualista Pichincha

Competitions

Serie A

First stage

Results

Second stage

Results

Third stage

Results

References
RSSSF - 1986 Serie A

External links
Official Site 
LDU Quito (2) - Filanbanco (4)

1986